Helicopter String Quartet (screen title: Karlheinz Stockhausen: Helicopter String Quartet) is a 78-minute 1996 Dutch English- and German-language independent underground experimental documentary art film directed by Frank Scheffer.

Synopsis

This piece requires four separate helicopters (provided for the 1995 performances by the Royal Netherlands Air Force). Within it, each helicopter carries (in addition to the pilot) one member of a string quartet, a sound technician, television camera, video, and three-channel audio transmitters, and all flying through the air simultaneously. It was premiered at the Holland Festival. The film contains interviews with Stockhausen, the string players Garth Knox, Rohan de Saram, Irvine Arditti, and Graeme Jennings, and the pilots about the piece. The film was premiered at the Chicago International Film Festival in October 1996, where it was nominated for several awards, was also screened at the Buenos Aires International Festival of Independent Cinema in April 2005, and was released on DVD by Medici.tv's label Medici Arts.

Reception
Critic Ben Sachs wrote: "I'm a dunce when it comes to the music, but I found the movie fascinating, in part because the story has so much ready-made suspense. Any number of things could go wrong in the execution of the quartet, and it's entertaining to see how the composer and his crew respond to each problem that arises—it's something of an intellectual action movie".

References

External links

 (Medici.tv's Medici Arts Channel) 

1990s avant-garde and experimental films
1996 documentary films
1996 independent films
1996 films
Documentary films about aviation
Documentary films about classical music and musicians
Documentary films about music festivals
Dutch avant-garde and experimental films
Dutch documentary films
Dutch independent films
1990s English-language films
Films about composers
Films directed by Frank Scheffer
Films set in 1995
Films set in Amsterdam
Films shot in Amsterdam
1990s German-language films
1996 multilingual films
Dutch multilingual films